The International Joint Conference on Biomedical Engineering Systems and Technologies -  BIOSTEC -  is an international joint conference composed of five co-located conferences each specialized in a different knowledge area:

 Biomedical Electronics and Devices – BIODEVICES
 Bioimaging – BIOIMAGING
 Bioinformatics Models, Methods and Algorithms – BIOINFORMATICS
 Bio-inspired Systems and Signal Processing – BIOSIGNALS
 Health Informatics – HEALTHINF

This joint conference is held annually and it seems to be interested in the dissemination of the novelties in the topics covered by its sub-conferences.

BIOSTEC had its first edition in 2008 counting with the participation of some keynote speakers like Kevin Warwick. Since then, several names have been invited to deliver keynotes to the BIOSTEC attendees. Among them: David Rose (MIT Media Lab, United States), Bradley Nelson, (ETH Zurich, Switzerland), Edward H. Shortliffe, (Arizona State University, United States), José C. Príncipe (University of Florida, United States), Alberto Cliquet Jr (University of São Paulo & University of Campinas, Brazil), Tanja Schultz (University of Bremen, Germany) e Vimla L. Patel, (Arizona State University, United States).

Besides the presentation of invited talks, the BIOSTEC conferences are composed by different kind of sessions like poster sessions, technical sessions, tutorials, special sessions, workshops, doctoral consortiums, panels and industrial tracks. The papers presented in the conference are made available at the SCITEPRESS digital library, published in the conference proceedings and some of the best papers are invited to a post-publication with Springer.

The 2019 edition of the conference will be held in cooperation with SSBE, ISCB, EURASIP, VDE DGBMT, EAMBES, LFTY and SFGBM.

Editions

References

External links
 Science and Technology Events
 Conference website
 Event management system
 WikiCfp call for papers

Information systems conferences
Computer science conferences
Academic conferences